Susana Norma Peper Campbell (born February 26, 1946) is an Argentine swimmer. She competed in two events at the 1964 Summer Olympics.

Early life and background 
Peper is the daughter of Olympic swimmers Roberto Peper and Jeannette Campbell.

References

1946 births
Argentine people of British descent
Argentine people of Scottish descent
Argentine people of Dutch descent
Argentine female swimmers
Female backstroke swimmers
Female breaststroke swimmers
Olympic swimmers of Argentina
Pan American Games competitors for Argentina
Swimmers at the 1963 Pan American Games
Swimmers at the 1964 Summer Olympics
Living people
20th-century Argentine women